Jonathan Terry  is a television and film actor. He is best known for his role as Starker in Halloween III: Season of the Witch and Colonel Glover in The Return of the Living Dead and Return of the Living Dead Part II.

Filmography

External links

Year of birth missing (living people)
Living people
American male film actors